Shipping modes may refer to:

 Terms of shipment
 Business-to-business (B to B)
 Shipping (B to C)
 Store to store (A to A)